Sir Cedric Webster Hardwicke (19 February 1893 – 6 August 1964) was an English stage and film actor whose career spanned nearly 50 years. His theatre work included notable performances in productions of the plays of Shakespeare and Shaw, and his film work included leading roles in several adapted literary classics.

Early life
Hardwicke was born in Lye, Worcestershire (now West Midlands) to Edwin Webster Hardwicke and his wife, Jessie (née Masterson). He attended Bridgnorth Grammar School in Shropshire. He intended to train as a doctor but failed to pass the necessary examinations. He turned to the theatre and trained at the Royal Academy of Dramatic Art (RADA).

Military service
Hardwicke enlisted at the outbreak of the First World War. He served with the London Scottish from 1914 to 1921 as an officer in the Judge Advocate's branch of the British Army in France. He was one of the last members of the British Expeditionary Force to leave France. According to the Daily Mirror 1 January 1934, Hardwicke was one of the officers who escorted The Unknown Warrior from France.

Career

Stage

Hardwicke made his first appearance on stage at the Lyceum Theatre, London in 1912 during the run of Frederick Melville's melodrama The Monk and the Woman, when he took over the part of Brother John. During this year, he was at Her Majesty's Theatre understudying, and subsequently appeared at the Garrick Theatre in Charles Klein's play Find the Woman, and Trust the People. In 1913, he joined Benson's Company and toured in the provinces, South Africa, and Rhodesia. During 1914 he toured with Miss Darragh (Letitia Marion Dallas, d. 1917) in Laurence Irving's play The Unwritten Law, and he appeared at the Old Vic in 1914 as Malcolm in Macbeth, Tranio in The Taming of the Shrew, the gravedigger in Hamlet, and other roles.

After serving in the British Army in WWI, he resumed his acting career. In January 1922, he joined the Birmingham Repertory Company, playing a range of parts from the drooping young lover Faulkland in The Rivals to the roistering Sir Toby Belch in Twelfth Night.

He played many classical roles on stage, appearing at London's top theatres, making his name on the stage performing works by George Bernard Shaw, who said that Hardwicke was his fifth favourite actor after the four Marx Brothers. As one of the leading Shavian actors of his generation, Hardwicke starred in Caesar and Cleopatra, Pygmalion, The Apple Cart, Candida, Too True to Be Good, and Don Juan in Hell, making such an impression that at the age of 41 he became the youngest actor to be knighted (this occurred in the 1934 New Year's Honours; Laurence Olivier subsequently took the record in 1947 when he was knighted at the age of 40). Other stage successes included The Amazing Dr. Clitterhouse, Antigone and A Majority of One, winning a Tony Award nomination for his performance as a Japanese diplomat.

In 1928, whilst appearing with Edith Day, Paul Robeson and Alberta Hunter in the London production of Show Boat, he married actress Helena Pickard.

In December 1935, Hardwicke was elected Rede Lecturer to Cambridge University for 1936, he took as his subject "The Drama Tomorrow". In the late 1930s, he moved to the U.S., initially for film work. In the early 1940s, he continued his stage career on tours and in New York.

In 1944, Hardwicke returned to Britain, again touring, and reappeared on the London stage, at the Westminster Theatre, on 29 March 1945, as Richard Varwell in a revival of Eden and Adelaide Phillpotts' comedy Yellow Sands, and subsequently toured in this on the continent. He returned to America late in 1945 and appeared with Ethel Barrymore in December in a revival of Shaw's Pygmalion, and continued on the New York stage the following year. In 1946, he starred opposite Katharine Cornell as King Creon in her production of Jean Anouilh's adaptation of the Greek tragedy Antigone.

In 1948, he joined the Old Vic Company at the New Theatre to play Sir Toby Belch, Doctor Faustus, and Gaev in The Cherry Orchard, but according to critic and biographer W.A. Darlington, "it was about this time that he confessed to a friend that he was finding the competition in London too hot for him", and he moved permanently to the U.S. In 1951–52, he appeared on Broadway in Shaw's Don Juan in Hell with Agnes Moorehead, Charles Boyer and Charles Laughton.

Film and television work
Hardwicke's first appearance in a British film was in 1931, and from the late 1930s, he was in great demand in Hollywood. He played David Livingstone opposite Spencer Tracy's Henry Morton Stanley in Stanley and Livingstone in 1939, and also played the evil Frollo in the remake of The Hunchback of Notre Dame starring Charles Laughton the same year. In 1940, he played Mr Jones in a screen version of Joseph Conrad's novel Victory. He starred as the unfortunate Ludwig von Frankenstein in The Ghost of Frankenstein (1942) alongside Lon Chaney Jr. as Frankenstein's monster and Bela Lugosi as Ygor.

Hardwicke played in films such as Les Misérables (1935) with Fredric March and Charles Laughton, King Solomon's Mines (1937), The Keys of the Kingdom (1944), The Winslow Boy (1948), Alfred Hitchcock's Rope (1948) with James Stewart, and Olivier's Richard III (1955). He was featured as King Arthur in the comedy/musical A Connecticut Yankee in King Arthur's Court (1949), singing Busy Doing Nothing in a trio with Bing Crosby and William Bendix, and as the Pharaoh Sethi in Cecil B. DeMille's 1956 film The Ten Commandments starring Charlton Heston as Moses.

He appeared in a 1956 episode of Alfred Hitchcock Presents titled Wet Saturday in which he portrayed Mr. Princey, an aristocratic gentleman who tries to cover up a murder to avoid public scandal. On 6 March 1958, he guest-starred on the TV series The Ford Show starring Tennessee Ernie Ford. During the 1961–62 television season, Hardwicke starred as Professor Crayton in Gertrude Berg's sitcom Mrs. G. Goes to College, which ran for 26 weeks on CBS. The story line had Berg attending college as a 62-year-old widowed freshman studying under Hardwicke, with whom she previously had acted. Earlier, Hardwicke guest-starred on the Howard Duff and Ida Lupino sitcom Mr. Adams and Eve. He starred in The Twilight Zone episode Uncle Simon that first aired 15 November 1963. His final acting role was in The Outer Limits in the episode "The Forms of Things Unknown".

Radio
In 1945, Hardwicke played Sherlock Holmes in a BBC Radio dramatisation of The Speckled Band, opposite Finlay Currie as Dr. Watson. Years later, Hardwicke's son Edward played Watson in the acclaimed Granada series.

Hardwicke played the titular role in a short-lived revival of the Bulldog Drummond radio program on the Mutual Broadcasting System, which ran 3 January 1954 to 28 March 1954.

Personal life
In 1928, he married the English actress Helena Pickard. They divorced in 1948; their son was actor Edward Hardwicke. His second marriage, which produced a son, Michael, and likewise ended in divorce, was to actress, Mary Scott (1921–2009), from 1950 to 1961.

A lifelong heavy smoker, he suffered from emphysema and died 6 August 1964 at the age of 71 in New York from chronic obstructive pulmonary disease. Hardwicke's body was flown back to England; after a memorial service he was cremated at Golders Green Crematorium in north London, where his ashes were scattered.

Legacy
Hardwicke left two volumes of memoirs: Let's Pretend: Recollections and Reflections of a Lucky Actor, 1932 and A Victorian in Orbit: as told to James Brough, 1962. He is commemorated by a sculpture by Tim Tolkien at Lye, commissioned by the Dudley Metropolitan Borough Council. The memorial takes the form of a giant filmstrip, the illuminated cut metal panels illustrating scenes from some of Hardwicke's better-known roles, which include The Hunchback of Notre Dame, Things to Come, and The Ghost of Frankenstein. Unveiled in November 2005, it is located at Lye Cross where he lived as a child. Thorns School and Community College in neighbouring Quarry Bank has renamed its drama theatre in his honour as the Hardwicke Theatre.

Hardwicke has a motion pictures star and a television star on the Hollywood Walk of Fame.

Filmography

 Nelson (1926) as Horatio Nelson (film debut)
 Dreyfus (1931) as Capt. Alfred Dreyfus 
 Rome Express (1932) as Alistair McBane
 The Ghoul (1933) as Broughton
 Orders Is Orders (1934) as Brigadier
 Bella Donna (1934)
 Nell Gwyn (1934) as Charles II 
 The Lady Is Willing (1934) as Gustav Dupont
 Jew Süss (1934) as Rabbi Gabriel
 The King of Paris (1934) as Max Till
 Les Misérables (1935) as Bishop Bienvenu
 Becky Sharp (1935) as Marquis of Steyne
 Peg of Old Drury (1935) as David Garrick
 Things to Come (1936) as Theotocopulos
 Tudor Rose (1936) as Earl of Warwick 
 Laburnum Grove (1936) as Mr Baxley
 Green Light (1937) as Dean Harcourt
 King Solomon's Mines (1937) as Allan Quartermain 
 On Borrowed Time (1939) as Mr Brink 
 Stanley and Livingstone (1939) as David Livingstone 
 The Hunchback of Notre Dame (1939) as Frollo
 The Invisible Man Returns (1940) as Richard Cobb 
 Tom Brown's School Days (1940) as Dr. Thomas Arnold 
 The Howards of Virginia (1940) as Fleetwood Peyton
 Victory (1940) as Mr Jones
 Sundown (1941) as Bishop Coombes
 Suspicion (1941) as General McLaidlaw
 Valley of the Sun (1942) as Lord Warrick 
 The Ghost of Frankenstein (1942) as Ludwig Frankenstein/Henry Frankenstein 
 Invisible Agent (1942) as Conrad Stauffer
 Commandos Strike at Dawn (1942) as Admiral Bowen
 Forever and a Day (1943) as Mr Dabb
 The Moon Is Down (1943) as Col. Lanser
 The Cross of Lorraine (1943) as Father Sebastian
 The Lodger (1944) as Robert Bonting
 Wilson (1944) as Senator Henry Cabot Lodge 
 Wing and a Prayer (1944) as Admiral 
 Three Sisters of the Moors (1944, short) as Reverend Bronte 
 The Keys of the Kingdom (1944) as Monsignor at Tweedside 
 The Picture of Dorian Gray (1945) as Narrator 
 Sentimental Journey (1946) as Jim Miller
 Beware of Pity (1946) as Albert Condor
 Nicholas Nickleby (1947) as Ralph Nickleby
 The Imperfect Lady (1947) as Lord Belmont
 Ivy (1947) as Police Inspector Orpington
 Lured (1947) as Julian Wilde 
 Tycoon (1947) as Alexander
 A Woman's Vengeance (1948) as James Libbard
 Song of My Heart (1948) as Grand Duke 
 I Remember Mama (1948) as Mr Hyde
 The Winslow Boy (1948) as Arthur Winslow
 Rope (1948) as Henry Kentley
 A Connecticut Yankee in King Arthur's Court (1949) as Lord Pendragon / King Arthur
 Now Barabbas (1949) as Governor
 The White Tower (1950) as Nicholas Radcliffe 
 You Belong to My Heart (1951) as Bernand
 The Desert Fox (1951) as Karl Strolin
 The Green Glove (1952) as Father Goron
 Caribbean Gold (1952) as Captain Francis Barclay
 Botany Bay (1953) as Gov. Phillips 
 Salome (1953) as Tiberius Caesar 
 The War of the Worlds (1953) as Commentary (voice)
 Bait (1954) as Prologue Speaker 
 Richard III (1955) as King Edward IV of England
 Diane (1956) as Ruggieri
 Helen of Troy (1956) as Priam 
 Gaby (1956) as Mr. Edgar Carrington
 The Vagabond King (1956) as Tristan
 The Power and the Prize (1956) as Mr Carew
 The Ten Commandments (1956) as Sethi
 Around the World in 80 Days (1956) as Sir Francis Cromarty
 The Story of Mankind (1957) as High Judge
 Baby Face Nelson (1957) as Doc Saunders 
 Five Weeks in a Balloon (1962) as Fergusson
 The Pumpkin Eater (1964) as Mr. James - Jo's father (final film role)

References

Bibliography
 Let's Pretend: Recollections and Reflections of a Lucky Actor, foreword by Sir Barry Jackson, (1932) Grayson & Grayson

External links

 
 
 
 Hardwicke Archive in the British Library Manuscripts Collections

1893 births
1964 deaths
Actors awarded knighthoods
Male actors from Worcestershire
Alumni of RADA
English male film actors
English male stage actors
English male television actors
Knights Bachelor
People educated at Bridgnorth Endowed School
People from the Metropolitan Borough of Dudley
Golders Green Crematorium
20th-century English male actors
British expatriate male actors in the United States
British Army personnel of World War I
London Scottish officers
Military personnel from Worcestershire
Deaths from emphysema